The 1993–94 Colonial Hockey League season was the third season of the Colonial Hockey League, a North American minor professional league. Eight teams participated in the regular season and the Thunder Bay Senators won the league title.

Regular season

Colonial Cup-Playoffs

External links
 Season 1993/94 on hockeydb.com

United Hockey League seasons
CHL
CHL